is a Japan-exclusive video game for the Super Famicom.

Summary

The game allows players to have the experience of wagering on Kyōtei races that are held all across Japan every year and wagered on by hundreds of spectators. Players have to bet money on up to three motorboats for a duration of anywhere from six to 24 months in a series of hydroplane racing events. There is only an opportunity to talk to the boss once a month. Each month consists of 24 races (each with a qualifying round, a semi-final round, and a final round). Just about anything about the competitors can be analyzed; including their name, the odds for each driver, and the selections for each player. Even after making the wagers, each player must still confirm their bets in order to move into the racing portion of the game. The AI competitors are skilled just like the actual professional racers.

Three laps are done for each race; with each participants doing left turns around an oval track with four turns. After the end of the third lap, the finishing order appears for the players to see. The next screen then shows much money that the players either gained or lost. Each race is shown on different camera angles; ranging from side view to a reverse chase view.

Reception
On release, Famicom Tsūshin scored the game a 16 out of 40.

References

1995 video games
Imagineer games
Japan-exclusive video games
Racing video games
Single-player video games
Super Nintendo Entertainment System games
Super Nintendo Entertainment System-only games
Video games developed in Japan
Video games set in Japan